Perry Archangelo Bamonte (born 3 September 1960) is an English musician best known as a member of the rock band The Cure from 1990 to 2005, and again since 2022.

Biography
Born in London, England, Bamonte became a guitar tech for The Cure in 1984. He joined the band as keyboardist in 1990, replacing Roger O'Donnell who abruptly quit after a tour, and Bamonte played both guitar and keyboards on the band's 1992 album Wish. Following the departure of Porl Thompson in 1993, Bamonte took on additional lead guitar duties, O'Donnell rejoined in 1995 to fill the keyboardist position. Bamonte appeared on the subsequent albums Wild Mood Swings, Bloodflowers, and The Cure. He has been credited for writing the music for the songs "Trust" from Wish, "This Is a Lie" from Wild Mood Swings, and "Anniversary" from The Cure. He also appeared on the live albums Paris and Show as well as Trilogy. 

In 2005, it was reported that Bamonte and Roger O'Donnell were let go by the Cure's leader Robert Smith, who wanted to make some changes to the group. Smith reportedly wanted to make the band a three-piece. The news was officially announced on May 27, 2005 on The Cure's website. On June 18, 2005, The Cure announced the return of former guitarist Porl Thompson. The seemingly abrupt changes in the band brought about rumors and speculation, while no official statement was given by Smith as to why Bamonte and O'Donnell were let go. While it was a surprise to both, both Bamonte and O'Donnell remained on amicable terms with Smith.     

In September 2012, Bamonte was revealed as the bassist for London band Love Amongst Ruin to help them tour their second album Lose Your Way. 

In March, 2019, Bamonte joined fellow members of The Cure, past and present, for their induction into the 2019 Rock and Roll Hall of Fame.

Bamonte rejoined The Cure in 2022 onstage as a guitarist/keyboardist, performing on the first night of the band’s “Lost World Tour” in Riga, Latvia.

Personal life 
His younger brother is Daryl Bamonte, who has worked with the Cure as their tour manager, and toured with Depeche Mode.

Bamonte is also a lifelong passionate fly fisherman who currently contributes art and illustration for the quarterly magazine Fly Culture.

Discography
 The Cure
 Wish (1992)
 Paris (1993)
 Show (1993)
 Wild Mood Swings (1996)
 Galore (1997)
 Bloodflowers (2000)
 Greatest Hits (2001)
 Trilogy (2003), DVD
 The Cure (2004)

References

External links
 About Perry Bamonte
 Perry Bamonte at Pictures of You

English people of Italian descent
The Cure members
1960 births
Living people
English keyboardists
English rock guitarists
Musicians from London
Italian British musicians
Love Amongst Ruin members